Amager Badminton Club (Amager BC or ABC) was a badminton club in Amager in Copenhagen, Denmark. It won the Danish Badminton League in 1957. The club had to close down in 2018 due to financial difficulties. Most players moved to the nearby club Amager BC37.

History
The club was founded on 15 March 1935.

Notable players
 Kirsten Thorndahl
 Tage Madsen
 Svend Pri
 Henning Borch

Achievements

Danish Badminton League
Champion: 1956-57

References

External links
 Official website

Badminton clubs in Copenhagen
Amager
Sports clubs established in 1935
1935 establishments in Denmark